De Witt Municipal Airport  is a public use airport in Arkansas County, Arkansas, United States. It is owned by the City of De Witt (or DeWitt) and located three nautical miles (6 km) southeast of its central business district. This airport is included in the National Plan of Integrated Airport Systems for 2011–2015, which categorized it as a general aviation facility.

Facilities and aircraft 
De Witt Municipal Airport covers an area of 79 acres (32 ha) at an elevation of 190 feet (58 m) above mean sea level. It has one runway designated 18/36 with an asphalt surface measuring 3,204 by 60 feet (977 x 18 m).

For the 12-month period ending August 31, 2016, the airport had 51,100 aircraft operations, an average of 140 per day: 99.8% general aviation and 0.2% military. At that time there were 18 single-engine aircraft based at this airport.

References

External links 
 De Witt Municipal (5M1) at Arkansas Department of Aeronautics
 Aerial image as of February 2000 from USGS The National Map
 
 

Airports in Arkansas
Transportation in Arkansas County, Arkansas
Buildings and structures in Arkansas County, Arkansas